Eryciini is a tribe of flies in the family Tachinidae

Genera
Acantholespesia Wood, 1987
Afrophylax Cerretti & O’Hara, 2016
Alsomyia Brauer & von Bergenstamm, 1891
Amazohoughia Townsend, 1934
Amblychaeta Aldrich, 1934
Amelibaea Mesnil, 1955
Ametadoria Townsend, 1927
Amphicestonia Villeneuve, 1939
Anadiscalia Curran, 1934
Anadistichona Townsend, 1934
Anemorilla Townsend, 1915
Antistasea Bischof, 1904
Aplomya Robineau-Desvoidy, 1830
Aplomyopsis Townsend, 1927
Aprotheca Macquart, 1851
Argyrochaetona Townsend, 1919
Argyrothelaira Townsend, 1916
Asseclamyia Reinhard, 1956
Austronilea Crosskey, 1967
Austrophryno Townsend, 1916
Azygobothria Townsend, 1911
Bactromyia Brauer & von Bergenstamm, 1891
Bactromyiella Mesnil, 1952
Botriopsis Townsend, 1928
Buquetia Robineau-Desvoidy, 1847
Cadurciella Villeneuve, 1927
Calocarcelia Townsend, 1927
Carcelia Robineau-Desvoidy, 1830
Carceliathrix Cerretti & O’Hara, 2016
Carcelimyia Mesnil, 1944
Carcelina Mesnil, 1944
Carceliodoria Townsend, 1928
Casahuiria Townsend, 1919
Catagonia Brauer & von Bergenstamm, 1891
Catena Richter, 1975
Cavalieria Villeneuve, 1908
Cestonia Rondani, 1861
Cestonionerva Villeneuve, 1929
Cestonioptera Villeneuve, 1939
Chaetosisyrops Townsend, 1912
Chetina Rondani, 1856
Chlorogastropsis Townsend, 1926
Chryserycia Mesnil, 1977
Chrysometopiops Townsend, 1916
Chrysosturmia Townsend, 1916
Cossidophaga Baranov, 1934
Descampsina Mesnil, 1956
Diaprochaeta Mesnil, 1970
Diglossocera Wulp, 1895
Doriella Townsend, 1931
Drino Robineau-Desvoidy, 1863
Elodimyia Mesnil, 1952
Epicampocera Macquart, 1849
Erycesta Herting, 1967
Erycia Robineau-Desvoidy, 1830
Etroga Richter, 1995
Eugaedioxenis Cerretti, O’Hara & Stireman, 2015
Euhygia Mesnil, 1968
Eulobomyia Woodley & Arnaud, 2008
Eunemorilla Townsend, 1919
Gymnophryxe Villeneuve, 1922
Heliconiophaga Thompson, 1966
Heliodorus Reinhard, 1964
Hubneria Robineau-Desvoidy, 1848
Hypersara Villeneuve, 1935
Iconofrontina Townsend, 1931
Intrapales Villeneuve, 1938
Isosturmia Townsend, 1927
Kaiseriola Mesnil, 1970
Lasiopales Villeneuve, 1922
Lespesia Robineau-Desvoidy, 1863
Lubutana Villeneuve, 1938
Lydella Robineau-Desvoidy, 1830
Madremyia Townsend, 1916
Metaphryno Crosskey, 1967
Montserratia Thompson, 1964
Myothyriopsis Townsend, 1919
Neolydella Mesnil, 1939
Neomedina Malloch, 1935
Nepocarcelia Townsend, 1927
Nilea Robineau-Desvoidy, 1863
Paradrino Mesnil, 1949
Periarchiclops Villeneuve, 1924
Phebellia Robineau-Desvoidy, 1846
Phonomyia Brauer & von Bergenstamm, 1893
Phorocerostoma Malloch, 1930
Phryxe Robineau-Desvoidy, 1830
Podosturmia Townsend, 1928
Procarcelia Townsend, 1927
Prometopiops Townsend, 1927
Prooppia Townsend, 1926
Prospalaea Aldrich, 1925
Pseudoperichaeta Brauer & von Bergenstamm, 1889
Pseudosturmia Thompson, 1966
Ptesiomyia Brauer & von Bergenstamm, 1893
Ptilocatagonia Mesnil, 1956
Rcortesia Koçak & Kemal, 2010
Rhinaplomyia Mesnil, 1955
Senometopia Macquart, 1834
Sericodoria Townsend, 1928
Setalunula Chao & Yang, 1990
Siphosturmia Coquillett, 1897
Sisyropa Brauer & von Bergenstamm, 1889
Stenosturmia Townsend, 1927
Sturmioactia Townsend, 1927
Sturmiomima Townsend, 1934
Sturmiopsis Townsend, 1916
Sturmiopsoidea Thompson, 1966
Stylocarcelia Zeegers, 2007
Telonotomyia Cortés, 1986
Teretrophora Macquart, 1851
Thecocarcelia Townsend, 1933
Thelairodrino Mesnil, 1954
Thelyconychia Brauer & von Bergenstamm, 1889
Thelymyia Brauer & von Bergenstamm, 1891
Thelymyiops Mesnil, 1950
Thysanosturmia Townsend, 1927
Tlephusa Robineau-Desvoidy, 1863
Topomeigenia Townsend, 1919
Townsendiellomyia Baranov, 1932
Tryphera Meigen, 1838
Tsugaea Hall, 1939
Verrugophryno Townsend, 1927
Wardarina Mesnil, 1953
Weingaertneriella Baranov, 1932
Xylotachina Brauer & von Bergenstamm, 1891
Zizyphomyia Townsend, 1916
Zygozenillia Townsend, 1927

References

Brachycera tribes
Exoristinae